Ganj Tappeh (also known as Gang Tappeh and Gunj Tepe) is a village in Sofalgaran Rural District, Lalejin District, Bahar County, Hamadan Province, Iran. At the 2006 census, its population was 1,779, in 437 families.

References 

Populated places in Bahar County